Richard Adolphus Musgrave (died 21 January 1841) was a Canon of Windsor from 1828 to 1841.

Family
He was the fourth son of Sir James Musgrave, Bart of Barnsley Park, Gloucestershire.

He married Catherine Lowther, daughter of Colonel James Lowther, on 3 July 1822 in St George’s Church, Hannover Square, London.

Career
He was educated at Westminster School 1812 - 1818 and at Trinity College, Cambridge graduating LLB in 1829.

He was appointed:
Curate at Crowell 1823
Rector of Compton Basset, Wiltshire 1825
Rector of Barnsley, Gloucestershire 1826 - 1841

He was appointed to the third stall in St George's Chapel, Windsor Castle in 1828, a position he held until 1841.

Notes 

1841 deaths
Canons of Windsor
People educated at Westminster School, London
Alumni of Trinity College, Cambridge
Year of birth missing